The Ham people are an ethnic group found in the southern part of Kaduna State in the northwestern region of Nigeria, predominantly in Jaba, Kachia and Kagarko Local Government Areas of southern Kaduna State, Nigeria. They speak the Hyam language and refer to themselves as Ham. They are known as the 'Jaba' in Hausa, but a recent study by a linguist who is a native of the area (John 2017) has definitely proven that the label 'Jaba' was derogatory and should be rejected. Some estimates place the Ham as numbering 400,000.

History
The Ham people are believed to have created the Nok culture after archaeological discoveries in the Ham village of Nok.

Culture
The Tuk-Ham festival is celebrated each year at Kwain (Popularly known as Kwoi by the Hausa), a town in the Local Government Area of Jaba. It is celebrated around the Easter season.

Religion
The majority of the Ham people are Christian, estimated at about 85%. About 75% of the population is defined by some sources as "Evangelical Christians", with 10% fitting other definitions of Christians.

Language

The Ham speak Hyam language.

Politics
Ham rulers are called Kpop Ham. Since 1974, the Kpop Ham is His Royal Highness (HRH) the Kpop-Ham Dr. Jonathan Danladi Gyet Maude (J.P.), OON.

Notable people
Notable people of Ham origin include:
 Martin Luther Agwai
 Andrew Jonathan Nok
 Adamu Maikori, first lawyer in Southern Kaduna
 Audu Maikori, co-founder and group CEO of Chocolate City Entertainment record label
 Yahaya Maikori, co-founder of Chocolate City Entertainment record label
 Admiral Ishaya Iko Ibrahim, Former Chief of Naval Staff and Sarkin Yaki Ham
 Felix Hassan Hyet, Former Minister of Aviation
 Justice Danlami Sambo, Former Justice Sokoto High Court
 Late Dr Chris Abashiya, Author, Politician and Activist
 Late AVM Usman Ma'azu, Former Military Administrator of Kaduna State 
 Col T.K Zabairu, Former Military Administrator of Imo State Yohanna Yarima Kure
 Yohanna Yarima Kure, Armed Forces Ruling Council (1985-1987) 
 Ambassador Bulus Lolo, RTD Permanent Secretary of the Ministry of Foreign Affairs
 Senator Haruna Aziz Zego, Senator 1999-2003
 Ambassador Nuhu Bajoga, Deputy Governor Kaduna State 2011-2015

References 

Ethnic groups in Nigeria